Philipp Turgay Gemicibaşi (born 23 April 1996) is a professional footballer who plays as a midfielder for Süper Lig club Kasımpaşa, on loan from Austria Klagenfurt. Born in Germany, he is a former youth international for Turkey.

Club career
In 2012, Gemicibaşi joined the youth academy of German Bundesliga side Köln but left due to indiscipline after being on the verge of signing a professional contract. After that, he joined the youth academy of RB Leipzig. However, he soon left because of not being able to adapt to living in the eastern part of Germany.

In 2014, Gemicibaşi signed for Viktoria Köln in the German fourth division from the Kaiserslautern youth academy, where he was injured.

In 2016, he signed for fifth division team Sportfreunde Siegen.

In 2017, Gemicibaşi signed for Mauerwerk in the Austrian third division.

In 2019, he signed for Austrian second division club Blau-Weiß Linz.

International career
Gemicibaşi was born in Germany and is of Turkish descent. He is a youth international for Turkey, having played for the Turkey U17s and U18s.

References

External links
 Turgay Gemicibasi at Soccerway

1996 births
Living people
People from Riesa
Turkish footballers
Turkey youth international footballers
German footballers
German people of Turkish descent
Association football midfielders
Sportfreunde Siegen players
FC Gütersloh 2000 players
FC Mauerwerk players
FC Blau-Weiß Linz players
SK Austria Klagenfurt players
Kasımpaşa S.K. footballers
Austrian Football Bundesliga players
2. Liga (Austria) players
Süper Lig players
Austrian Regionalliga players
Footballers from Saxony
Turkish expatriate footballers
Turkish expatriate sportspeople in Austria
German expatriate footballers
German expatriate sportspeople in Austria
Expatriate footballers in Austria